Euparyphus bistriatus is a species of soldier flies in the tribe Oxycerini.

Distribution
St. Vincent.

References

Stratiomyidae
Insects described in 1896
Endemic fauna of Saint Vincent and the Grenadines
Taxa named by Samuel Wendell Williston
Diptera of North America